The Razorback Handicap is a Grade III American Thoroughbred horse race for four-year-olds and older at a distance of one and one-sixteenth miles on the dirt run annually in February at Oaklawn Park Race Track in Hot Springs, Arkansas.  The event currently offers a purse of $700,000.

History

The event was inaugurated on 20 February 1960 as a $3,200 allowance race over the sprinting distance of  furlongs and was won by Cyrob in a time of 1:05.80. The next season the race was scheduled later in March with an increased purse and distance of one mile and seventy yards thus becoming a natural preparatory race for the track's signature event for older horses - the Oaklawn Handicap which is held in April. The first horse to perform the double feat was Swift Ruler in 1966. That year Swift Ruler set a new track and stakes record for the Razorback winning in a time of 1:39.

In 1968 the event was run in split divisions. The winner of the second division, Barb's Delight had finished second in the 1967 Kentucky Derby The following year the distance of the event was increased to  miles.

In 1978 the event was upgraded to Grade III.

Other notable winners of the event include Cox's Ridge in 1978 and 1981 winner Temperence Hill who resumed after being crowned the 1980 United States Champion Three-Year-Old Colt.
The 1989 winner, Allen E. Paulson's Blushing John went onto be crowned United States Champion Older Male Horse. The 2017 United States Champion Older Male Horse Gun Runner began his championship campaign with an emphatic  length victory as the 1/5on favorite.

Between 2005 and 2008, the Breeders' Cup sponsored the event which reflected in the name of the event.

Records
Speed record:
 miles – 1:40.40  Lost Code (1988)
1 mile and 70 yards – 1:39.20  	Swift Ruler (1966)

Largest Winning Margin:
    lengths –  Golden Lad  (2014)

Most wins by a jockey:
 6 – Pat Day (1982, 1983, 1985, 1989, 1990, 1993)

Most wins by a trainer:
 5 – Joseph B. Cantey  (1978, 1981, 1982, 1983, 1984)

Most wins by an owner:
 2 – Earl Allen (1966, 1967)
 2 – Loblolly Stable  (1978, 1981)
 2 – Happy Valley Farm (1982, 1983)
 2 – Allen E. Paulson (1982, 1983)
 2 – Don C. McNeill (2001, 2002)

Razorback Handicap – Oaklawn Handicap double:
 Swift Ruler (1966), Charlie Jr. (1970), Gage Line (1972), Cox's Ridge (1978), Temperence Hill (1981), Eminency (1982), Lost Code (1988), Opening Verse (1990), Alternation (2012), Cyber Secret (2013), Raceday (2015)

Winners

Notes:

§ Ran as an entry

† In the 2010 running of the event Win Willy was first past the post and wagering was paid out as the winner, however the horse returned a positive swab for the presence of two non-steroidal anti-inflammatory drugs and consequently was disqualified from the prizemoney and was placed eighth (last). As a result, the first-place purse was awarded to Spotsgone and all other finishers were advanced one position for the purposes of purses.

See also
List of American and Canadian Graded races

External links
 Oaklawn Park Media Guide 2020

References

Graded stakes races in the United States
Horse races in Arkansas
Oaklawn Park
Recurring sporting events established in 1960
1960 establishments in Arkansas
Grade 3 stakes races in the United States